Khasab Airport  is an airport serving Khasab, a harbor city in Oman and capital of the Musandam Governorate (muhafazah). The harbor opens onto the Strait of Hormuz.

The airport lies in a valley between two close mountain ridges. Another ridge lies just off the departure end of Runway 19. Runway 19 has a  displaced threshold.

Airlines and destinations

See also
Transport in Oman
List of airports in Oman

References

External links
SkyVector - Khasab Airport

Airports in Oman
Musandam Governorate